Leron is a given name. Notable persons with the name include:

Leron Black (born 1996), American basketball player
Leron Lee (born 1948), American baseball player
Leron Mitchell (born 1981), Canadian football player
Leron Thomas (born 1979), American musician